The following is a list of characters from the Japanese anime and manga series Grenadier.

Main characters

Rushuna Tendou
First appearance: Episode 1

 is an extremely busty, 16-year-old, blonde senshi who was trained in the positive teachings and kind ideals of Tenshi. A former pre-Juttensen candidate, she is trained in the use of a revolver, specializing in shooting to disable rather than to kill using a form of Gun-Kata as seen in the final battle with Setsuna. Rushuna fights to end strife and chaos.  She has excellent tactical analytical skills, being able to discern her opponents' weaknesses in the heat of battle and adjust accordingly to exploit them with the tools at her disposal. She also hugs opponents who are difficult to negotiate with to her chest in order to pacify them. She has also been known to hide ammunition  in her cleavage. Rushuna has a weakness for taking hot baths, and she indulges in this pursuit frequently. There are signs that she has feelings for Yajirou but does not want to follow up with them until her objective is over, there are times where she can be jealous when she sees him with other girls but she knows he always comes back to her. Rushuna earns the title of "Grenadier, the smiling Senshi" from Tenshi at the end of the series. Her first name may be a reference to a Rushana Buddha, while her surname means "heavenly path" - appropriate considering her status as a traveler.

In the manga, many people point out that Rushuna is a foreigner (or at least of foreign ancestry) because of her natural blonde hair and large bust. She also had an older sister who rivaled her in skill but was corrupted by the Baron Iron Mask. She was raised by the eccentric Soun who taught her everything she knew.
This differs from the anime in that she was trained in the Capital.

At the end of the manga series, she visits her homeland, and after that she marries Yajirou.

Yajiro Kojima
First appearance: Episode 1

 is a swordsman also known as the "Rearguard Tiger" or "Tiger of the Rearguard", who battles in an attempt to bring about world unity. He is called the Tiger by Templar because the more cornered Yajiro becomes, the greater his abilities become. A former rebel, he was working as a mercenary until he met Rushuna. Although Yajiro disdains the use of firearms, he is very skilled and can dodge bullets and parry them with his sword. He is also shown to be physically very strong by tossing and crushing boulders with his bare hands. He can also slice massive cannon shells in half. Yajiro hates guns because he believes that gunners see the weight of a person's life in how hard it is to pull the trigger. However he later states that he does not see Rushuna in the same light as he does other gunners. The route that he, Rushuna, and Mikan take towards Tento's capital by crossing Mt. Charanbo and then White Wizard Lake retraces the same route that he followed when he was with the rebel army that attempted to invade the capital a year and a half ago and is thus memory-laden for him. Rushuna calls him "Yat-chan", an informal name he is initially irritated with, but grows to accept. Not too far into the anime, Yajiro seems to hint having some feelings towards Rushuna, evident on numerous occasions where he either is embarrassed by her words, protects her without saying why, or shows jealousy towards her almost sisterly relationship with Mikan.

In the manga, he belonged to a branch family of the Kojima clan. This clan was led by Midare Kojima and his sister, Suguna. Yajiro intended to go out and make a name for himself, ensuring the safety of his village. While on a journey, Suguna gave her life to save Yajiro's own. His role in the manga seems to be more on the comic relief side until in the later half of the manga.

After the events in Volume 7 of the manga, Yajiro is said to have never lost a fight after that. He and Rushuna go on to get married.

Mikan Kurenai
First appearance: Episode 5

 is an orphaned girl who comes from a family of balloon makers. Despite her young age, she is a master balloon artist, being able to construct balloons of all shapes and sizes. After her parents were killed by Tenma Ganzo's senshi, she was rescued by Touka Kurenai, and accepted her offer to join Touka and the other dispossessed girls of her village. Since then she has worked for Touka at the Peach Blossom Tower while nursing dreams of revenge. After Rushuna helps her see beyond revenge, she is unable to kill Ganzo when she has the chance. Mikan then leaves Touka Kurenai and joins Rushuna and Yajirou on their journey, to 'keep an eye on them'. In the manga, when she grows older she takes over running the Peach Blossom from Touka.

Other characters

Tenshi
First appearance: Episode 1 (in a flashback)

 is the Empress of Tento. She is a young and wise woman who taught Rushuna the ultimate battle strategy: to eliminate the opponent's willingness to fight without fighting.

Kaizan Doushi
First appearance: Episode 2

 is the Jester who helps Oomidou Setsuna in her plans of world domination. He was the former rebel leader known as "Mountain Templar," who a year and a half before the final episode, led the rebel army over Mt. Charanbo and onto White Wizard Lake in their march on the capital. His fate was unknown after Suirou's attack on the rebel boats left only a few survivors, including Yajiro, who greatly respected him. Although his main weapon is an Enlightened Evil gun, Kaizan is a skilled swordsman. He also has the ability to teleport and can fly using specialized boots. He had been evil for at least ten years.

Setsuna Oomido
First appearance: Episode 3 (impersonating Tenshi); Episode 12 (not in the guise of Tenshi)

 is another of Tenshi's extremely busty body doubles. Like Rushuna, she was a pre-Juttensen candidate chosen for the role and had received the same training in the use of a revolver. Thus, her fighting skills and shooting prowess rival Rushuna's. She imprisons Tenshi and impersonates her in order to take control of the capital and the Juttensen, hoping to one day rule the world. It is implied that she and Doushi are lovers. After her defeat by Rushuna, she decides to undertake a similar journey.

Kasumi
First appearance: Episode 10

 is a shotgun wielding former colleague of Yajirou when he was with the rebels. She is a double agent in the capital, pretending to be a rebel, but is secretly in league with Kaizan Doushi (the Jester) and Setsuna Oomido. Her cover as a prostitute allows her to conceal her shotgun in a rolled up bamboo mat. She falls in love with Teppa Aizen after he uses his armor cloth to ensnare her and prevent her from shooting Rushuna, and decides to switch sides. Much to the displeasure of Teppa's other female admirers, she wants him all to herself.

Ganzo Tenma
First appearance: Episode 5

 is the leader of a group of bandits whose senshi killed Mikan's parents. After three of Touka Kurenai's workers were rescued by Rushuna from his men, he tracks Rushuna down to the Peach Blossom Tower and tries to destroy it with the aid of Banmaru Zoushi. After Rushuna defeats him and Mikan spares his life, he joins Touka, helping rebuild the Peach Blossom Tower.

Why it was changed is uncertain.

Furon
First appearance: Episode 2

 is the 17-year-old king of Tara, a country which borders Tento. He is beloved by his subjects and well known for his generosity. Fearful for his kingdom's security, Furon was manipulated by the Jester ten years ago into using Enlightened Evil to protect his people. As a result, he physically appears much younger than he actually is, although this is officially explained as being caused by a disease. One of the distinguishing features of the monstrous looking armored suit that he uses in combat to conceal his identity is its blonde mane, and a bounty is placed on the suit by the Weapon Regulations Bureau for the death and destruction that Furon has caused while wearing it. This leads to Rushuna being confused with the armored suit as the bounty is described as having blonde hair. After Rushuna destroys his armored suit and defeats him, Furon physically returns to his biological age. He then becomes convinced by Rushuna that he does not need weapons such as Enlightened Evil for Tara's protection because all of his people are behind him.

Koto
First appearance: Episode 2

 is a young woman who works at Yamaishi’s Bar, where Yajirou and Rushuna briefly stay while they are passing through Tara. She is a great admirer of King Furon and wears a pendant that she received from him when he visited the bar. Koto prepares a medicinal bath for Rushuna to help her recover from the wounds inflicted on her by Furon in his armored suit. The Jester injures her, which provokes Rushuna into attacking Furon's castle. In the manga, she was instead struck down and killed by the Jester, who took the blow which was intended to Rushuna but dodged it.

Banmaru Zoushi
First appearance: Episode 5

 is a gadget master allied with Tenma Ganzo who aspired to become a Juttensen. After Rushuna defeats him he joins Touka, drawing up plans for the reconstruction of Peach Blossom Tower. Banmaru later constructs a massive cannon using the Peach Blossom Tower as a base that can fire a shell all the way to the capital to deliver Touka Kurenai there quickly after she receives Mikan's balloon-delivered urgent request for assistance.

Nago Akki
First appearance: Episode 1

 is a huge man who is the leader of a large band of bandit senshi who succeed in taking over Lord Kanetsugu’s castle and holding him for ransom. They are able to easily hold the castle against Kanetsugu’s more numerous men because the latter do not have any firearms. Nagou himself wields a large machine gun named Guld that is strapped to his left arm. It compensates for its low velocity and lack of accuracy with its high firepower. Rushuna singlehandedly defeats Nagou and his band, using her revolver to literally peel off his armor (as opposed to the manga, where Rushuna just shoots him in the head).

Kanetsugu
First appearance: Episode 1

Kanetsugu is the lord of a castle located on a road in a mountainous area that Rushuna has to pass through. Devil Nagou  and his men succeed in capturing his castle and taking him hostage. Yajirou is hired as a mercenary by one of his generals in their bid to rescue him. Kanetsugu was used as bait to lure Yajirou and Rushuna into a minefield in the castle’s courtyard. After Rushuna defeats his senshi, Nagou attempts to flee with Kanetsugu, but fails. Kanetsugu’s men are very devoted for him and attempt several assaults on the castle to try and rescue him, despite suffering heavy casualties and repeated failures.

Midare Kojima
First appearance: Volume 5

 is the clan leader of Kojima village. The Kojima clans' livelihood has always been to serve as mercenaries or farmers. He blamed Yajirou for the death of his younger sister Suguha and initiated a confrontation.
Midare wields the Thunderclap Longsword, a weapon that can generate electricity. Settling their differences, he gave the Tiger Fang Great Sword, the Family Heirloom, to Yajirou.

Tekka Aizen
First appearance: Volume 7

 is Teppa's little sister. After learning Rushuna defeated her brother, she challenged her to a strange contest of capture the flag.

The Juttensen
The  are the assassins of Tento and only five are directly named in the anime. They bear each of the ten sacred weapons. The other five are depicted in the 5th Volume of the manga.

Touka Kurenai
First appearance: Episode 5

 is the madam of a brothel named the Peach Blossom Tower and originally one of the Ten Heavenly Enlightened. Years ago she saved Mikan from Ganzo's gang after they had killed her parents and offered to take her in. After setting up the Peach Blossom Tower, she continues to take in those orphaned or homeless after battles and allow them to work for her.  She is also a practitioner of Tenshi's ultimate battle strategy, and allies with Rushuna when the latter proves that she is following Tenshi's plan. Touka suffers from an unknown illness, the exact nature and severity of which is not elaborated upon. She keeps it a secret from her girls and it largely does not affect her combat abilities unless she is closely pressed. Her weapon is a lance with an exploding ball attached to a chain that can be used to deflect bullets. She is not related to Mikan despite having the same surname. A flashback involving Kasumi hints that she was the one who repelled the Rear Guard at the end of the tunnel in the capital and that she shortly thereafter left the Heavenly Enlightened. Although she and Rushuna fight each other in both adaptations, the reason is different for each; In the manga, she is enraged at how Rushuna gets in a quarrel with Mikan and ends up inflicting heavy damage to her brothel. In the anime, she is convinced that Rushuna is a criminal wanted directly by Tenshi, but in reality the order was issued by Setsuna.

In the manga, she used to train the Juttensen and now her younger sister, Ouka leads them.

Sanzo Souma
First appearance: Episode 7

 is the Blade-Bard Enlightened. He is strong enough to knock large trees down, but his primary weapons are sound-based. They include sound waves known as the Voice of God produced from his gauntlets that damage the target's inner ear, and vibrations that affect equilibrium that emanate from an odd accordion/piano object that he wears on his chest, the Annihilation Surge Array, which operates by blowing air through the nose into it. Souma is killed by the Jester after Rushuna defeats him, though in the manga he was simply stripped of his Juttensen-title.

Teppa Aizen
First appearance: Episode 8

 is the Cloth Skill Enlightened, whose father was also a Juttensen.  Teppa is the 10th head of the Aizen Clan and has known Rushuna since they were children.  He possesses a skill passed down through his family which took 300 years to perfect: the Aizen Style Armor Cloth Skill. It allows the user to transform any cloth into a living weapon or armor - he personally uses adamantium cloth. He also uses explosive gauntlets. After Rushuna defeats him, he allies with her and aids her when she later arrives in the capital. Teppa has also been a closet pervert since he was younger and is now a ladies' man in the capital. Thanks to his adamantium cloth, he is the only member of the Juttensen to survive the attack of the Jester after having failed to defeat Rushuna. In the manga, Teppa and Rushuna did not know each other in childhood, but still become friends after their first battle. Teppa became very infatuated with Rushuna after that and constantly tries to woo her, but Rushuna is oblivious of his advances.

Fuuka Shirato
First appearance: Episode 9

 is the Welding Wild Dance Enlightened. One of Yajirou's former comrades, she was the only one who called him "Tiger." During the rebels' march on Tento while crossing the treacherous Mt. Charanbo, Yajirou was unable to save her after she fell off a cliff and she was presumed dead. However, the Jester saved her from her fall and caused an Enlightened Evil gun to assimilate with her, thus making her and the weapon one and the same. He later took Fuuka to the capital where she met Tenshi (Setsuna Oomido in disguise), who revealed that her and the rebels' goal of uniting all lands was the same, thus securing her loyalty. After she discovers that the Jester is her former leader, the Mountain Templar, Fuuka uses her Enlightened Evil gun to defend Yajirou from his attack. However, the resulting blast pushes both of them over a cliff. In a repetition of their previous situation, this time Fuuka tells Yajirou to fulfill his goal his own way and jerks her hand out of his, causing her to fall to her death.

In the manga, she is replaced with Suguha Kojima, the sister of Yajirou's clan leader.

Shin'noshin Hakubi
Voiced by: Kazuki Yao (矢尾 一樹 Yao Kazuki)

First appearance: Episode 10

 is the Water Wolf Senshi and is also known as the Master of White Wizard Lake, a large lake shrouded in fog which lies between the capital and Mt. Charanbo. He was responsible for decimating the remnants of the rebel army led by the Mountain Templar who had survived the Charanbo crossing and were attempting to cross the lake to reach the capital a year and a half ago because they were unable to defend themselves against his underwater attacks. Suirou assumes the guise of a ferryman to get Rushuna and her companions to the middle of the lake before destroying their boat and dragging Rushuna to the lake floor, where he then dons his underwater combat suit. The suit is armed with large claws that also function as propellers for increased mobility, and Suirou also makes use of a handheld torpedo launcher. He also uses handheld signs for one-way communication with Rushuna underwater (also used towards Teppa in the Capital in the manga). He is killed by the Jester after Rushuna defeats him, though in the manga he was simply stripped of his Juttensen-title.

Yuzuriha Shimon
First appearance: Volume 5

 is a masked female Juttensen who wields an energy whiplike weapon. Known as The Brilliant Explosive.

Danjo Oma
First appearance: Volume 5

 is a long haired male Juttensen known as "The Cunning". He can create shockwaves with his superhuman strength and gauntlets on his fists.
In the translation of the manga, Danjo and Honmaru's names were inadvertently switched.

Honmaru Tojo
First Appearance: Volume 5

 is a small boy Juttensen who uses the Heat Armor, a mechanical suit.
In the translation of the manga, Honmaru and Danjo's names were inadvertently switched.

References

Grenadier